Kimberly Birrell was the defending champion, but chose not to participate.

Lizette Cabrera won the title, defeating Abbie Myers in the final, 6–4, 4–6, 6–2.

Seeds

Draw

Finals

Top half

Bottom half

References

Main Draw

Darwin Tennis International - Singles
Darwin Tennis International